Werner Attinger is a former Swiss curler.

Teams

Private life
Werner Attinger grew up in a family of curlers. His father Peter Attinger Sr. is a 1972 Swiss men's champion. His brothers - Peter Jr., Bernhard, Ruedi and Kurt - are curlers too, they won Swiss and European championships and Worlds medals when they played in Peter Jr.'s team. His nephew (Peter Jr.'s son) Felix is skip of team, he won Swiss men's silver in 2017 and bronze in 2016; Peter Jr. coached his team. Bernhard's daughter Sandra Ramstein-Attinger is a competitive curler too, she played on three Women's Worlds with teams skipped by Silvana Tirinzoni and Binia Feltscher-Beeli.

References

External links
 

Living people

Swiss male curlers
European curling champions
Swiss curling champions
Year of birth missing (living people)